Lonicera villosa, also known as mountain fly honeysuckle, is a species of honeysuckle native to North America.

Growth
Lonicera villosa is a small bush, ranging from 1 to 5 feet in height.   The elongated white flowers grow in clusters, while its blue berries grow in pairs.

Distribution
Lonicera villosa occurs across the Northern and Northeastern United States, as well as Central, Eastern, and Northern Canada.

Uses
The berries of Lonicera villosa are edible and sometimes mistaken for blueberries.

References 

villosa